Anson Wood Burchard (April 21, 1865 – January 22, 1927) was an American businessman. He was the vice-chairman of General Electric and the chairman of General Electric International, having served many years as a vice president of General Electric.  In addition, he was a director for several public utility companies.

Burchard was an associate of AIEE. During WWI, he acted as assistant to Benedict Crowell, who was Director of Munitions.  He was the third husband of Allene Tew.

He died suddenly at the home of Mortimer L. Schiff.

References

1927 deaths
American chairpersons of corporations
General Electric people
1865 births